"As the Rush Comes" is a song by American progressive group Motorcycle. Motorcycle was a collaboration between San Francisco-based trance duo Gabriel & Dresden with vocalist Jes. It was released as the group's first single in 2003 and was a number-one single on the US Billboard Hot Dance Airplay chart in 2004, where it would become the first year-end number-one Dance Airplay track that same year. Additionally, "As the Rush Comes" became a transatlantic hit, peaking at number 11 in the United Kingdom and reaching the top 20 in Finland, Flanders, and the Netherlands.

History
There were several remixes of "As the Rush Comes" which were recorded, such as the "Chillout Remix" made by Gabriel & Dresden, featured on the 3rd-season episode of Nip/Tuck, used on CSI Episode 214 Stalkerazzi. The "Chillout Remix" was also featured in the 2015 movie Maze Runner: The Scorch Trials. The television series Entourage featured the "Sweeping Strings Radio Edit" by Gabriel & Dresden as it was the first release. The "Gabriel & Dresden Sweeping Strings Radio Edit" was featured in Dance Dance Revolution: Extreme 2 for the PlayStation 2. Other versions includes remixes by the British trance group Above & Beyond, and Dutch trance DJ Armin van Buuren.

Track listings

US 12-inch single
A. "As the Rush Comes" 
B. "As the Rush Comes" 

US CD single
 "As the Rush Comes" 
 "As the Rush Comes" 
 "As the Rush Comes" 

UK CD single
 "As the Rush Comes"  – 3:30
 "As the Rush Comes"  – 10:46
 "As the Rush Comes"  – 9:54
 "As the Rush Comes"  – 8:40
 "As the Rush Comes"  – 6:24
 "As the Rush Comes" 

UK 12-inch single 1
A. "As the Rush Comes"  – 10:46
B. "As the Rush Comes"  – 11:45

UK 12-inch single 2
A. "As the Rush Comes"  – 9:54
B. "As the Rush Comes"  – 8:40

Dutch maxi-CD single
 "As the Rush Comes" 
 "As the Rush Comes" 
 "As the Rush Comes" 
 "As the Rush Comes" 
 "As the Rush Comes" 
 "As the Rush Comes"

Charts

Weekly charts

Year-end charts

References

2003 debut singles
2003 songs
Jes (musician) songs
Positiva Records singles
Ultra Music singles